Tuxpan (or Túxpam, fully Túxpam de Rodríguez Cano, for Enrique Rodríguez Cano) is both a municipality and city located in the Mexican state of Veracruz. The municipality includes many smaller outlying communities, the largest of which are Alto Lucero and Santiago de la Peña. A local beachside community is also nearby.

Overview
Tuxpan or Túxpam, pronounced  in Nahuatl, the language of the ancient Nahuas, literally means "Place of Rabbits", a compound of tochtli "rabbit" and -pan "place".

Being the nearest port to Mexico City, Tuxpan is an important commercial link for Mexican imports and exports. Tuxpan is now primarily a grain port, with emphasis on soybeans and maize. Off-shore links to oil pipelines are used to transfer petroleum products to and from tanker ships operated by Pemex, Mexico's state-owned oil company. As part of the Pemex operations and infrastructure in the city, a facility on the river manufactures and maintains oil rigs for use in the Gulf of Mexico.

In the 1870s, a small colony of some hundreds of former Confederate (Southern U.S.) officers, soldiers and diplomats was established.

Climate
Tuxpan experiences a tropical climate with warm winters and hot summers.

Transport

Port of Tuxpan
 
Sometimes referred to as the "Puerto de Tuxpan", the port is able to handle supertanker-sized cargo ships.
Due to increasing commercial shipping traffic in the city of Veracruz, Tuxpan is now the headquarters for the Mexican Navy's Gulf fleet. These ships were originally s built in the 1960s. They were purchased from the United States Navy in the mid to late 1990s after their decommissioning.

Tuxpan was also the port of departure for the yacht Granma that was used to transport Fidel Castro, his brother Raúl, Che Guevara and other fighters of the Cuban Revolution from Mexico to Cuba in 1956 for the purpose of overthrowing the regime of Fulgencio Batista. A small museum near the river has photographs and other related memorabilia.

Education

The Universidad Veracruzana maintains two campus in the city. The first, the Ciencias Biológicas y Agropecuarias  was opened in 1975 and offers careers related to the fields of Biology, Veterinary and Agriculture. The second one, the Contaduría Faculty offers careers related to administration and was opened in 1990.

Twin towns
  Niquero (Granma, Cuba)

References

 Link to tables of population data from Census of 2005 INEGI: Instituto Nacional de Estadística, Geografía e Informática
 Veracruz Enciclopedia de los Municipios de México

Notes

External links

Tuxpan municipal government
DIF Tuxpan
  Municipal Official Information
Enciclopedia de los Municipios de Mexico

Populated places in Veracruz